Intel Capital is a division of Intel Corporation, set up to manage corporate venture capital, global investment, mergers and acquisitions. Intel Capital makes equity investments in a range of technology startups and companies offering hardware, software, and services targeting artificial intelligence, autonomous technology, data center and cloud, 5G, next-generation compute, semiconductor manufacturing and other technologies.

History
Intel Capital was set up in 1991 by Les Vadasz, and Avram Miller. It was originally called Corporate Business Development (CBD). At that time, Intel mainly invested in American companies, and in 1998 95% of investment was in the USA. Over time, investment in non-US companies increased, and by 2012 international investments accounted for about 57%.  Intel Capital has invested more than US$12.5 billion in over 1,550 companies in 57 countries. In that timeframe, over 200 portfolio companies have gone public on various exchanges around the world, and more than 325 were acquired or participated in a merger.

In 2014, Intel Capital has 26 offices, including in Belgium, Brazil,  China, India,  Germany, Ireland, Japan, Israel, Nigeria,  Poland,  Russia,  Singapore, South Korea, Taiwan, Turkey, UK, USA

Investments 

Intel Capital investments include Actions Semiconductor, AlterGeo, AppyStore, AVG, Bellrock Media, Box, Broadcom, Cloudera, CNET, Citrix Systems, Elpida Memory,  Gaikai, Gigya, IndiaInfoline.com,  Inktomi, Insyde Software, Integrant Technologies, July Systems, Kingsoft, LogMeIn, Mall.cz, Marvell, Mellanox, Mirantis, MongoDB, MySQL, NIIT, Ondot Systems, PCCW, Red Hat, Rediff.com, Research in Motion (Blackberry), Saffron Technology, Sasken, StarkWare Industries,  Smart Technologies, Snapdeal, Sonda, Sohu.com, Stratoscale, TechFaith, Trigence, VMware, Volocopter and WebMD. In 2014 Intel Capital has made $62 Mn investment in 16 tech startups, In September 2017, According to the reports, Intel Capital invested $1 billion into AI startups including Mighty AI, Data Robot, Lumiata and many more. In 2020 Intel Capital invested in Jio Platforms.

References

External links 
Intel Capital official website
https://techcrunch.com/tag/intel-capital/
http://allthingsd.com/tag/intel-capital/

Intel
Financial services companies established in 1991
Venture capital firms of the United States